Cricinfo Magazine was a monthly cricket magazine published by the Wisden Group from January 2006 to July 2007. The publisher was Infomedia. The magazine, focused on cricket in India, and co-branded with Cricinfo, replaced Wisden's previous Wisden Asia Cricket. The founding editorial team, led by Sambit Bal, was inherited from Wisden Cricket Asia. The magazine was discontinued after the July 2007 edition, shortly after ESPN acquired Cricinfo from Wisden in June 2007.

See also
The Wisden Cricketer  the Wisden Group's UK focused cricket magazine, which was sold to British Sky Broadcasting in April 2007

References

External links
 Launch announcement

2006 establishments in India
2007 disestablishments in India
Defunct cricket magazines
Defunct magazines published in India
Monthly magazines published in India
Sports magazines published in India
Magazines established in 2006
Magazines disestablished in 2007